Praolia is a genus of longhorn beetles of the subfamily Lamiinae, containing the following species:

 Praolia citrinipes Bates, 1884
 Praolia hayashii (Hayashi, 1974)
 Praolia mizutanii Niisato, 1990
 Praolia umui Kusama & Takakuwa, 1984
 Praolia yakushimana Hayashi, 1976

References

Saperdini
Cerambycidae genera